Thepchaiya Un-Nooh (born 18 April 1985) is a Thai professional snooker player.

He has won one ranking event, the 2019 Snooker Shoot Out, and finished as runner-up in the 2019 World Open. He is regarded as one of the fastest snooker players on the World Tour, averaging less than 17 seconds per shot during the 2017–18 and the 2019–20 snooker seasons.

Career
Un-Nooh first entered the professional tour for the 2009–10 season by winning the 2008 IBSF World Snooker Championship. He dropped off the main tour after just one season.

2012–13 season
He received the Thai nomination to compete on the snooker tour for the 2012–13 season. As a new player on the tour, he needed to win four matches to reach the main stage of the ranking events. He lost in the third qualifying round in three of the first four ranking events of the season. In September, it was announced that his match at the Players Tour Championship – Event 3 against Steve Davis was under investigation due to unusual betting patterns. Un-Nooh moved from an 8/11 odds-on favourite to 11/8 against just before the match started, and went on to lose 0–4 to the six-time world champion. World Snooker released a statement in November to confirm that there was insufficient evidence, and that no further action would be taken against Un-Nooh. He reached the final qualifying round for the UK Championship and the World Open, but lost to Michael Holt and Ryan Day respectively. Un-Nooh played in nine of the ten Players Tour Championship Events during the season; his best results were three last-16 defeats in European Tour Events, and he finished 46th on the PTC Order of Merit. His season ended when he was beaten 3–10 by Ben Woollaston in the third round of World Championship Qualifying, which saw him finish the year ranked world number 69.

2013–14 season
Un-Nooh lost in the qualifying rounds for the first four ranking events of the 2013–14 season, but then beat Gerard Greene 6–5 to reach the International Championship in Chengdu, China. In his first appearance in the main draw of a ranking event he thrashed Zhang Anda 6–1, before losing by the same scoreline to Neil Robertson in the last 32. However, the experience seemed to kick start Un-Nooh's season as in 2014 he played at the venue stage of four of the remaining six ranking events. He beat Ronnie O'Sullivan 5–4 in qualifying for the German Masters, with the reigning world champion playing high risk exhibition shots throughout the match, but Un-Nooh was whitewashed 5–0 by Jack Lisowski in the first round. At the World Open, Un-Nooh led Stephen Maguire 3–0, before the world number eight rallied to win four frames in a row. The match went into a deciding frame in which Un-Nooh made a break of sixty, only for Maguire to get a chance to win but then miss the final brown, handing Un-Nooh a big scalp. He then reached the last 16 of a ranking event for the first time by beating Andrew Higginson 5–1 and lost 5–2 to Graeme Dott, despite missing the final pink when on a 147 break during the match. Un-Nooh advanced to the last 32 of the China Open by whitewashing 1997 world champion Ken Doherty 5–0, before losing 5–3 against Ding Junhui. His performances during the campaign saw him end it in the top 64 in the world rankings for the first time as he was placed 59th.

2014–15 season
Un-Nooh qualified for the International Championship for the second year in a row, but was edged out 6–5 by Fergal O'Brien in the first round. He also lost in a deciding frame in the first round of the UK Championship against Robin Hull, despite making breaks of 137 and 117 during the match. Un-Nooh won five games to reach the semi-finals of the Xuzhou Open where he beat Mark Williams 4–1 to play in his first final in a professional event. He was defeated 4–1 by Joe Perry, but he described Un-Nooh as an exceptional talent after the match.

Un-Nooh defeated defending champion Ding Junhui in the first round of the Indian Open, calling it his biggest win after the match. He also stated that he didn't feel he could win the title. Nevertheless, he whitewashed Luca Brecel 4–0 and then recorded wins over Jamie Jones and Mark Davis to reach the semi-finals of a ranking event for the first time. Un-Nooh compiled a trio of half-century breaks to race into a 3–0 lead over Ricky Walden, but went on to lose 4–3. His Asian final saw him finish fourth on their Order of Merit to make his debut in the Grand Final, where he was knocked out 4–1 by Mark Williams in the first round. Un-Nooh's rise up the rankings continued as he ended the year 49th in the world.

2015–16 season
Un-Nooh scored his first professional win at the 2015 Six-red World Championship in Bangkok, Thailand. He beat world champion Stuart Bingham and former UK Champion Judd Trump en route to a final with China's Liang Wenbo, which he won 8–2 in frames. Un-Nooh missed the final black in attempting to make a maximum break in his 6–2 loss to Neil Robertson at the UK Championship. He appeared on Channel 4 show TFI Friday a few days later to recreate the shot, and this time potted it. At the World Grand Prix, Un-Nooh eliminated Marco Fu 4–3 and Mark Allen 4–2 to reach the quarter-finals. He made breaks of 97, 84 and 74 to lead 3–1, but Ding Junhui took the match 4–3. Incredibly, in the final round of World Championship qualifying, Un-Nooh missed another 147 final black. He did make a 144 later on in the match, but his opponent Anthony McGill won 10–7. Un Nooh increased his ranking by 16 places over the year to end it as the world number 33.

2016–17 season
Un-Nooh knocked out world number one Mark Selby 5–3 in the second round of the World Open, and then whitewashed Alan McManus 5–0 and beat Anthony McGill 5–2. In the semi-finals he suffered a 6–1 loss to Ali Carter. In the third round of the Paul Hunter Classic against Kurt Maflin, Un-Nooh finally made his first professional 147 break, after twice missing the final black the previous season. It earned him £40,000, and he won the match 4–1 before then narrowly beating Mark Allen and David Grace both 4–3, to reach the semi-finals of a ranking tournament for the second successive event. Un-Nooh lost 4–2 against Tom Ford. He struggled to build on this afterward, for he could not win a first-round match until the 2017 Welsh Open, in which he beat Ben Woollaston 4–0 and then saw off Ryan Day 4–1, before being defeated 4–1 by Barry Hawkins. After a last 16 finish at the Gibraltar Open his season ended on a low note as he lost in the first round of qualifying for the World Championship with a 10–9 defeat against Peter Lines.

2017–18 season
At the invitational 2017 Six-red World Championship, Un-Nooh reached the final and was level at 2–2 against Williams before losing 2–8. His season was generally pretty quiet, with his best ranking finish being reaching the last 16 at the World Open, where he was eliminated 5–1 by Kyren Wilson. However he did qualify for the World Championship for the second year running after recording victories over Alexander Ursenbacher (10–8), Adam Stefanow (10–4), and Alfie Burden (10–8). Drawn against John Higgins in the first round (who subsequently went on to reach the final), he recorded two century breaks but ultimately lost out 10–7. He finished the season ranked 56th.

2018–19 season
Un-Nooh's best showing in a ranking event for the first half of the 2018–19 snooker season was at the Northern Ireland Open, where he defeated Robert Milkins 4–0, Ross Muir 4–0, Chris Totten 4–1, and Robbie Williams 4–0 before meeting Mark Selby in the quarter-finals where he lost 5–3. Un-Nooh then secured his first ranking event title at the 2019 Snooker Shoot Out, beating Michael Holt with a break of 74. This came after he made the highest break in the tournament's history, 139, in the semi-finals to beat Jamie Clarke. He secured a £32,000 prize and became the second player from Thailand to win a ranking event. He once again qualified for the World Championship, recording victories over Johnathan Bagley, Mark Joyce and Joe O'Connor. He was drawn against eventual champion Judd Trump in the first round, and lost 10–9 in a classic match, despite being 6–3 up and having a chance to win in the deciding frame.

2019–20 season
In the first half of the 2019–20 snooker season, Un-Nooh's best performances in ranking events were last 16 finishes at the Riga Masters and English Open, where he was defeated by Kurt Maflin and Ricky Walden respectively. He also added another title by winning the non-ranking Haining Open, defeating Li Hang 5–3 in the final. Just one week later at the World Open, Un-Nooh recorded victories over Zhang Yang, Craig Steadman, Sunny Akani, David Gilbert and Kyren Wilson to reach his second ranking final. Facing Judd Trump, he fell 7–1 behind including conceding a frame after three fouls, but rallied to 8–5 before Trump took the remaining two frames. He picked up £75,000 for reaching the final which is his highest single-event prize to date. He also reached the quarter-finals of the Scottish Open where he lost out 5–3 to Jack Lisowski in an entertaining match, the European Masters where he lost 5–1 to Neil Robertson, and the Gibraltar Open where he lost 4–0 to Kyren Wilson. For the 2020 World Snooker Championship delayed by the COVID-19 pandemic, he came through qualifying for the third year in a row with victories over Dominic Dale and Liam Highfield, and was drawn against Ronnie O'Sullivan in the first round. However, in a match played behind closed doors, he was demolished 10–1 in a fastest ever best-of-19 match at the Crucible, which lasted just 108 minutes. Like his previous two first round opponents at the World Championship, O'Sullivan would also go on to reach the final (and, like Trump the previous year, win the tournament).

2020–21 season
In a season largely played behind closed doors in Milton Keynes, Un-Nooh struggled to get into a rhythm of winning matches, with his best ranking finishes being last 16 appearances at the Northern Ireland Open, Shoot Out and Gibraltar Open. However his performances from the previous season were enough to propel him into the top 16 in the rankings for the first time by October, and would ensure he would make a first appearance at the Masters. Drawn against reigning champion Stuart Bingham, he slipped to 5–1 behind but rallied to 5–4, before Bingham won the tenth frame and the match 6–4. His season ended with a disappointing 6–5 defeat to Igor Figueiredo in the first round of qualifying for the World Championship.

2021–22 season
Despite starting the season ranked 19th, Un-Nooh endured a poor run of form through most of the 2021–22 snooker season, with his best showing by March being a last 32 appearance at he English Open. Despite losing to Fan Zhengyi in qualifying for the German Masters, he made the third maximum break of his career during the match. At the Turkish Masters, he was under pressure for ranking points and defeated local wildcard Ismail Turker, Stephen Maguire and Jordan Brown before losing in the last 16 to Matthew Selt but gaining some much needed points. He then entered qualifying for the World Championship with relegation from the tour a possibility. He defeated Andrew Pagett (6–4), Jak Jones (6–5), and recorded a first ever victory over Matthew Selt (10–7) to save his tour card and advance to the Crucible. Un-Nooh lost to John Higgins 10–7 in the first round proper.

Playing style
Un-Nooh is noted for his rapid playing style, and ability to win frames and matches quickly with explosive speed and heavy scoring, while his playing style has varyingly been described as "scary", but also "frustrating" due to his over-emphasis on attacking play which can make him vulnerable in safety exchanges or scrappy frames.

He is also notably only the second player (after Jamie Cope) to achieve a 155 break in a witnessed frame and the first to achieve it on camera after compiling one during a practice match against Hossein Vafaei.

Performance and rankings timeline

Career finals

Ranking finals: 2 (1 title)

Minor-ranking finals: 1

Non-ranking finals: 4 (2 titles)

Pro-am finals: 2 (1 title)

Amateur finals: 3 (2 titles)

References

External links

 
Thepchaiya Un-Nooh at worldsnooker.com

Living people
1985 births
Thepchaiya Un-Nooh
Asian Games medalists in cue sports
Cue sports players at the 2010 Asian Games
Thepchaiya Un-Nooh
Medalists at the 2010 Asian Games
World champions in snooker
Thepchaiya Un-Nooh
Thepchaiya Un-Nooh
Southeast Asian Games medalists in cue sports
Competitors at the 2007 Southeast Asian Games
Competitors at the 2011 Southeast Asian Games
Competitors at the 2009 World Games
Thepchaiya Un-Nooh